A French tacos (or commonly tacos) or matelas (French for "mattress") is a fast food dish which usually consists of a flour tortilla grilled and folded around a filling of French fries, cheese, and meat, among other deli ingredients. More similar to a burrito than to a taco, and claiming inspiration from Mexican cuisine, it originated from the region of Rhône-Alpes in France in the early 2000s, before becoming popular among teenagers and young adults in all of France and abroad.

Description 
Despite the name, the French tacos has little to do with tacos and is more similar to a burrito or quesadilla. French tacos have also been compared to the panini and the döner kebab sandwich, and is similar to the California burrito.

The tacos consists of a flour tortilla wrapped or folded in a rectangular shape around a filling which usually includes:

 various types of meat, such as chicken, turkey or beef, in the form of mince, escalopes, chicken nuggets, döner kebab, cordon bleu, turkey lardons, etc.;
 French fries;
 cheese, be it any type of French cheese, usually French Emmental, or cheddar, processed cheese (like The Laughing Cow's Toastinette, or meltable American cheese) or a cheese sauce may be used instead;

 an additional sauce or relish, which is generally any of white döner kebab sauce, Algérienne sauce, ketchup, mayonnaise, harissa, BBQ sauce, or other sauces usually available in kebab shops;

 vegetables, generally in the form of salad mix, but also in other forms such as shakshouka.

It is then served warmed by grilling (with the use of a panini grill) or toasting.

Many different recipes exist, and it is common for French tacos restaurants to deliver made to order products by letting customers choose à la carte from the aforementioned ingredients. Meat-free variants also exist.

Most French tacos made in France are marketed as halal-certified, and as such do not contain pork, in order to accommodate Muslim customers.

A newsletter of Vaulx-en-Velin described it as "In short, a rather successful marriage between panini, kebab, and burrito".

History 

There are conflicting accounts about the exact origin of the French tacos. Some accounts say it was invented in the mid-2000s by Algerian born brothers Abdelhadi and Mohammed Moubarek as they were running a kebab shop in Savoy. French documentary series 66 minutes, on the other hand, credits Mohamed Soualhi, founder of the chain Tacos Avenue (formerly Tacos King) with inventing the sandwich in Lyon in the late 2000s. However, Soualhi himself, as well as other sources, have affirmed that "French tacos" were first sighted in fast food restaurants in the city of Vaulx-en-Velin near Lyon in the early 2000s.

By the late 2000s, French tacos had become popular among teenagers and young adults in Rhône-Alpes. Years later, their popularity spread to the rest of France as dedicated chains ran massive ad campaigns, with the help of social media and celebrity endorsements.

In 2013, the Moubarek brothers opened the first French-tacos, "Tacos de Lyon" in Mers Sultan. The sandwich later became popular among young adults in the major cities of the Kingdom. Similar restaurants were opened in other countries such as Senegal.

There was a negative reception from some Mexicans in France saying that French tacos were inappropriate cultural appropriation.

Name origin 
The origin of the name "French tacos" is subject to as much speculation as the sandwich itself. Daniel Shkolnik of Vice describes the naming as tacos as "a kind of marketing bait-and-switch, drawing people with the promise of a Mexican culinary icon and then selling them something completely different." As its popularity grew, the sandwich was gradually branded as tacos français to tell it apart from the original taco. In turn, the taco is sometimes referred to in France as "Mexican taco" to emphasize the difference between the two dishes.

See also 

 Afghani burger
 Döner kebab
 Dürüm
 Fusion cuisine
 Halal snack pack
 Korean taco
 Panini
 Poutine
 Taco rice - a fusion dish from Okinawa, Japan
 Mitraillette - a Belgian fast-food item typically containing similar ingredients but placed in a baguette
 Kapsalon

References

Notes

Citations

Further reading

Tortilla-based dishes
French cuisine
Fast food
Street food
Mexican fusion cuisine
French fusion cuisine
Taco